Francis Scarpaleggia  (born June 6, 1957 in Montreal, Quebec) is a Canadian politician. He is a member of the Liberal Party of Canada and Member of Parliament for the riding of Lac-Saint-Louis, which encompasses the west of the island of Montreal, Quebec. Scarpaleggia was first elected to the House of Commons of Canada in the 2004 federal election, and was re-elected in 2006, 2008, 2011, 2015, 2019, and 2021. He is chair of the House of Commons Standing Committee on Environment and Sustainable Development and previously served on a variety of House of Commons committees; namely, the committees on Public Safety, Canadian Heritage, Transport, and Government Operations and Estimates. He was also chair of the House of Commons Special Committee on Electoral Reform, a committee created pursuant to a 2015 Liberal election platform commitment on electoral reform. From 2011 to 2021 he served as the chair of the National Liberal Caucus, an eventful period in Canadian politics that saw the Liberal Party of Canada move from third party status in the House of Commons (second opposition party) to forming government in one election cycle under the leadership of Justin Trudeau.

Education 

Scarpaleggia attended Loyola High School, a semi-private Jesuit-run high school in western Montreal, and subsequently Marianopolis College and McGill University where he obtained an honours degree in economics. Following graduation from McGill, he studied at Columbia University in New York, obtaining a master’s degree in economics. He then obtained an MBA at Montreal’s Concordia University.

Career before politics 

Following graduation from business school, he joined the private sector working for Petro-Canada and Comterm, a Quebec-based microcomputer and keyboard-terminal manufacturer and local-area-network software developer. He subsequently entered Montreal’s pharmaceutical industry as a corporate financial analyst working for Bristol-Myers Squibb, and transitioned to education, teaching business administration at Montreal’s Dawson College.

Political life 

Scarpaleggia's involvement in politics began as a volunteer in the riding of Mount Royal during the 1981 Quebec election, working for the Liberal incumbent John Ciaccia, who was re-elected to the provincial legislature. Following the election, which saw the separatist Parti Québécois elected for a second term, he remained active as a grassroots provincial Liberal organizer, notably serving as the youngest riding president (Mount Royal provincial riding association) in the Quebec Liberal Party at the time. In 1984, he became involved in the Liberal Party of Canada in the federal riding of Mount Royal.

Prior to being elected, he worked from 1994 to 2004 as legislative assistant to Clifford Lincoln, a former environment minister in the Quebec government who then served, after entering federal politics, as parliamentary secretary to the Minister of the Environment and then as chair of the House of Commons Standing Committee on Canadian Heritage.

Scarpaleggia was first elected to Parliament in the 2004 Canadian federal election following a competitive local nomination contest. 

Since first being elected, he has focused on issues of freshwater protection, introducing various water bills and motions in the House of Commons, including a bill to ban bulk-water exports. As a member of the House of Commons environment committee, he has initiated water-focused studies such a study on the Alberta oilsands industry’s impacts on the Athabasca River watershed.

He holds a reputation as a dedicated constituency representative, close to his electors and focused on their political concerns and priorities.

Personal life 

Scarpaleggia was born in 1957, the son of Maurice Scarpaleggia, a businessman turned college administrator, and Lois Doucet. His paternal grandfather, Frank Scarpaleggia, was a Montreal barber and barbershop owner. His maternal grandfather, Louis Doucet, worked in building services at Montreal’s historic Sun Life Building. His paternal grandparents immigrated from Italy and his maternal grandmother immigrated from Ireland. His maternal grandfather was French-Canadian born in Quebec.

He was raised in Laval, Quebec, and later in the Town of Mount Royal, a Montreal-island suburb. He has been married to Jan Ramsay since 1998. They have two grown daughters.

Electoral record

References

External links
 

1957 births
Anglophone Quebec people
Canadian people of Italian descent
Liberal Party of Canada MPs
Living people
Members of the House of Commons of Canada from Quebec
People from Kirkland, Quebec
Politicians from Montreal
Academic staff of Dawson College
McGill University alumni
Columbia University alumni
Concordia University alumni
21st-century Canadian politicians